Ramapuram is a village in Krishna district, Andhra Pradesh, India. It is located in Nandivada mandal. It is famous for being the birthplace of veteran Telugu actor Akkineni Nageswara Rao.

References

Villages in Krishna district